Volle may refer to:

Volle, 2005 novel from the Argaea series by Kyell Gold
Võlle, village in Kose Parish, Harju County, Estonia

People
Dag Krister Volle (1963–1998; better known as Denniz Pop), Swedish DJ, music producer and songwriter
Frédéric Volle (born 1966), French handball player
Michael Volle (born 1960), German operatic baritone 
Walter Volle (1913–2002), German rower

Heraldry
Vol (heraldry), a pair of conjoined wings (or "wings conjoined")